John Scott Maclay, 1st Viscount Muirshiel,  (26 October 1905 – 17 August 1992) was a British politician, sitting as a National Liberal and Conservative Member of Parliament before the party was fully assimilated into the Unionist Party in Scotland in the mid-1960s.

Lord Muirshiel served as Secretary of State for Scotland from 1957 to 1962 within Harold Macmillan's Conservative government, having held a number of junior ministerial posts beforehand. In 1964, he was elevated to the House of Lords.

Background and education
Maclay was the fifth son of Joseph Paton Maclay, 1st Baron Maclay, and the younger brother of Joseph Maclay, 2nd Baron Maclay. He was educated at Winchester and Trinity College, Cambridge, and was bowman in the victorious Cambridge boat in the 1927 Boat Race.  At Cambridge, he was also a member of the University Pitt Club.

Political career
In 1940 Maclay was elected in a wartime by-election as Member of Parliament (MP) for Montrose Burghs. During the Second World War, he led the British Merchant shipping Mission to Washington, D.C., leading to his appointment to the Order of St Michael and St George as a Companion (CMG) in the 1944 Birthday Honours. In 1945 he briefly served as Parliamentary Private Secretary to the Minister of Production. He retained his Montrose seat at the 1945 general election. During the 1945 to 1951 Labour government, he led the National Liberals in the House of Commons. The Montrose Burghs constituency was abolished for the 1950 general election, and Maclay was instead returned for West Renfrewshire, a seat he held until 1964. He served under Winston Churchill as Minister of Civil Aviation and Minister of Transport between October 1951 and May 1952. In 1952 he was admitted to the Privy Council.

Maclay remained out of office until October 1956 when he was appointed Minister of State for the Colonies by Sir Anthony Eden. When Harold Macmillan became Prime Minister in January 1957, he was made Secretary of State for Scotland with a seat in the cabinet. He continued in this post until July 1962, when he was a victim of the "Night of the Long Knives", when one-third of the Cabinet lost their ministries. In 1964 Maclay was raised to the peerage as Viscount Muirshiel, of Kilmacolm in the County of Renfrew. He had been made a Companion of Honour in 1962 and was made a Knight of the Thistle in 1973. From 1967 to 1980 he served as Lord-Lieutenant of Renfrewshire.

Personal life
Lord Muirshiel married Betty, daughter of Delaval Graham L'Estrange Astley, in 1930. The marriage was childless. She died in June 1974, aged 71. Lord Muirshiel remained a widower until his death in August 1992, aged 86. The viscountcy died with him. He is buried alongside a number of family members including the Barons Maclay in the Mount Zion Church graveyard in Quarrier's Village near Kilmacolm in his former West Renfrewshire constituency.

See also
List of Cambridge University Boat Race crews

References

Torrance, David, The Scottish Secretaries (Birlinn 2006)

External links 
 

Muirshiel, John Scott Maclay, 1st Viscount
Muirshiel, John Scott Maclay, 1st Viscount
Muirshiel, John Scott Maclay, 1st Viscount
Muirshiel, John Scott Maclay, 1st Viscount
Members of the Parliament of the United Kingdom for Scottish constituencies
Muirshiel, John Scott Maclay, 1st Viscount
Lord-Lieutenants of Renfrewshire
Muirshiel, John Scott Maclay, 1st Viscount
Muirshiel, John Scott Maclay, 1st Viscount
Muirshiel, John Scott Maclay, 1st Viscount
Secretaries of State for Scotland
UK MPs 1935–1945
UK MPs 1945–1950
UK MPs 1950–1951
UK MPs 1951–1955
UK MPs 1955–1959
UK MPs 1959–1964
UK MPs who were granted peerages
Scottish male rowers
Unionist Party (Scotland) MPs
Younger sons of barons
Ministers in the Churchill caretaker government, 1945
Ministers in the third Churchill government, 1951–1955
Ministers in the Eden government, 1955–1957
Ministers in the Macmillan and Douglas-Home governments, 1957–1964
Viscounts created by Elizabeth II